Torquigener balteus, commonly known as the slender blaasop, is a fish of the pufferfish family Tetraodontidae native to the Western Indian Ocean.

References

Fish of South Africa
Fish of the Indian Ocean
Fish described in 1989
balteus